"Give Me the Night" is a song recorded by American jazz and R&B musician George Benson, which he released from his 1980 studio album of the same title. It was written and composed by Heatwave's keyboard player Rod Temperton and produced by Quincy Jones. Patti Austin provides the backing and scat vocals that are heard throughout, and one of Benson's fellow jazz guitarists, Lee Ritenour, also performs on the selection.

The song was a commercial success, and was Benson's first single to hit number one on the US Billboard Soul Singles chart. It also peaked at number four on the US Billboard Hot 100 chart, making it his most successful pop entry. It also peaked at number two on the Billboard Hot Disco Singles chart and at number seven in the UK Singles Chart, where it ties with "In Your Eyes" as his highest charting single.

Track listing
Warner Bros. WBS 49505 (US, 7")

"Give Me the Night"
"Dinorah, Dinorah"

Qwest/Warner Bros. K 17673 (UK, 7")

"Give Me the Night"
"Breezin'"

Warner Bros. LV 40 (US, 12")

"Give Me the Night" (long version)
"The World Is a Ghetto"
"Breezin'"

Personnel 
 George Benson – guitar, lead vocals
 Lee Ritenour – guitar
 Abraham Laboriel – bass guitar
 John Robinson – drums
 Herbie Hancock – electric piano
 Richard Tee – synthesizer bass
 Michael Boddicker – synthesizer
 Paulinho da Costa – percussion
 Patti Austin, Diva Gray, Jocelyn Brown, Tom Bahler, Jim Gilstrap – background vocals
 Jerry Hey – trumpet, string and horn arrangements
 Kim Hutchcroft, Larry Williams – saxophone, flute
 Quincy Jones – producer, rhythm arrangements
 Rod Temperton – rhythm and vocal arrangements

Charts

Weekly charts

Year-end charts

Certifications

Uses and samples
The song was covered by singer Randy Crawford for her 1995 album Naked & True.
The song is used as a sample in "Je danse le Mia" by French hip hop band IAM.
The song is parodied as "Le Casse de Brice" in the French film Brice de Nice.

See also
List of number-one R&B singles of 1980 (U.S.)

References

1980 singles
1980 songs
Disco songs
George Benson songs
Song recordings produced by Quincy Jones
Songs written by Rod Temperton
Warner Records singles